is a public transport company in Nagano Prefecture, Japan. It is the core company of Alpico Group and is wholly owned by Alpico Holdings Co., Ltd.
The company was known as  until its merger with two affiliate companies on April 1, 2011.

Headquarters 
The company's headquarters are at 1-1 Igawajō 2-chōme, Matsumoto, Nagano Prefecture 390-8518 Japan.

Area served 
The company serves the cities of Chino, Nagano, Matsumoto, Nagano, Okaya, Nagano, Suwa, Nagano, and their vicinities.

History
May 29, 1920 - Incorporated as Chikuma Railway (筑摩鉄道)
October 2, 1921 - Opens Shimashima Line railway between Matsumoto and Niimura.
May 3, 1922 - Extends Shimashima Line from Niimura to Hata.
September 26, 1922 - Extends Shimashima Line from Hata to Shimashima.
October 31, 1922 - Renamed as Chikuma Electric Railway (筑摩電気鉄道)
April 19, 1924 - Opens Asama Line tramway between Matsumoto and Asama-onsen.
December 2, 1932 - Renamed as Matsumoto Electric Railway
1942 - Merges with Matsumoto Jidōsha (松本自動車) bus company.
1955 - Renames Shimashima Line as Kamikōchi Line.
April 1, 1964 - Abolishes Asama Line.
September 28, 1983 - As a result of typhoon disaster, suspends a section of Kamikōchi Line between Shin-Shimashima and Shimashima.
December 31, 1984 - Officially abolishes the suspended section of Kamikōchi Line.
April 1, 2011 - Merges with Kawanakajima Bus and Suwa Bus and renamed as Alpico Kōtsū.

Railway operation 
The company operates the Kamikōchi Line railway, which serves the Kamikōchi tourism area in conjunction with bus service.

The Asama Line, closed in 1964, was a tramway that connected the city of Matsumoto with Asama Onsen hot spa resort.

Bus operation
The company operates highway bus routes and commuter bus routes.

Highway bus routes
Chuo Kosoku Bus
Matsumoto Bus Terminal - Shinjuku: servicing it in collaboration with Keio Bus
Hakuba - Shinjuku: servicing it in collaboration with Keio Bus
Chuo-do Kosoku Bus
Matsumoto Bus Terminal - Nagoya
servicing it in collaboration with Meitetsu Bus
Matsumoto Bus Terminal - Chubu Centrair International Airport
Alpine Matsumoto Go
Matsumoto Bus Terminal - Osaka
servicing it in collaboration with Hankyu Bus
Misuzu Highway Bus
Nagano - Matsumoto Bus Terminal
Matsumoto Bus Terminal - Iida

See also 

Kawanakajima Bus
Suwa Bus

References

External links
Official website

Bus companies of Japan
Companies based in Nagano Prefecture
Railway companies of Japan